Knox-Johnstone House, also known as Ben Allen Knox House, is a historic home located near Cleveland, Rowan County, North Carolina.  It was built about 1880, and is a two-story weatherboarded frame farmhouse with Italianate-style finish. It has a projecting center, entrance bay, and a nearly full-facade porch. Also on the property is the contributing large bell-cast gambrel roof barn dated to the 1930s.

It was listed on the National Register of Historic Places in 1993.

References

Houses on the National Register of Historic Places in North Carolina
Italianate architecture in North Carolina
Houses completed in 1880
Houses in Rowan County, North Carolina
National Register of Historic Places in Rowan County, North Carolina
1880 establishments in North Carolina